The 2002 Oregon State Beavers football team represented Oregon State University  in the Pacific-10 Conference (Pac-10) during the 2002 NCAA Division I-A football season. Led by fourth-year head coach Dennis Erickson, the Beavers compiled a 8–4 regular season record (4–4 in Pac-10, tied for fourth), but lost the Insight Bowl to the Pittsburgh Panthers in Phoenix on December 26.

After the season in February, Erickson left for the NFL's San Francisco 49ers, and previous head coach Mike Riley was rehired.

Schedule

Roster

Game summaries

Oregon

References

Oregon State
Oregon State Beavers football seasons
Oregon State Beavers football